Desná is a short river in the Liberec Region of the Czech Republic. It is 2.3 km long and is a left tributary of the Kamenice, to which it enters in Tanvald.

It originates in the Jizera Mountains and has two tributaries, Bílá Desná and Černá Desná (the "White Desná" and the "Black Desná").

Description 
Desná is a left tributary of the Kamenice River in the Jablonec nad Nisou District in the Liberec Region. The length of the stream is 2.3 km. The catchment area is 50.75 km2.

Etymology 
The river has an old Slavic name mentioned as early as 1577. The word desná was in Old Czech significance "right", in this case, the right tributary of another river - the former inhabitants proceeded normally up rivers from the lowlands to the mountains, and so all flows, considered today for the left hand, were from their perspective right hand and vice versa.

References 

Rivers of the Liberec Region